SS Norlantic was an American cargo ship of the Norlasco Steamship Company of New York that was scuttled after being damaged by  in May 1942 with the loss of seven lives. The ship was built as SS Lake Fandango, a Design 1099 ship of the United States Shipping Board (USSB), in 1919 and had also sailed under the name SS Lexington.

Career 
Lake Fandango was laid down by the Detroit Shipbuilding Company of Wyandotte, Michigan for the USSB and launched on 24 December 1919. Details of her merchant career after her March 1920 completion are not reported in secondary sources. In 1933, the ship was sold to the Merchants & Miners Transportation Company of Baltimore, Maryland, and was renamed Lexington. In 1941, the ship was sold to the Norlasco Steamship Company of New York and renamed Norlantic.

In May 1942, Norlantic, loaded with a  general cargo that included cement and steel pipe, sailed from Pensacola, Florida for Puerto La Cruz, Venezuela. At 03:38, U-69, under the command of Kapitänleutnant Ulrich Graf, launched two torpedoes that missed the ship. After the first several shell hits on Norlantic, her crew tried to signal the German boat that they were abandoning ship to avoid further attack, and launched two lifeboats and two life rafts. Graf, unaware of the signal attempt, continued shelling the boat. At 04:11, three minutes after a coup de grâce hit Norlantics port boiler room, the battered vessel was scuttled by the captain, taking down six men—two killed below, and four killed by shellfire during the evacuation of the boat. A seventh man in one of the lifeboats later died of his wounds.

On the afternoon of 16 May, three days after the attack, the pair of lifeboats was spotted by Netherlands trading schooners India and Mississippi, which took the boats under tow to Bonaire.

References 
 Allied Ships hit by U-boats: Norlantic at Uboat.net

 

Design 1099 ships
Ships built in Wyandotte, Michigan
1919 ships
Ships sunk by German submarines in World War II
World War II shipwrecks in the Caribbean Sea
Maritime incidents in May 1942